Gianni Morandi (born 11 December 1944) is an Italian pop singer, actor and entertainer.

Early life 
Gian Luigi Morandi was born in a little village called Monghidoro on the Tuscan-Emilian Apennines. His father Renato was active within the Italian Communist Party and Gianni used to help him sell the party newspapers. At an early age Morandi worked as a shoe-shiner, cobbler and as a vendor of sweets in the village's only cinema. His vocal abilities led him to a number of small gigs, some of which were during the Communist Party's activities.

Career 

He made his debut in 1962 and quickly placed high at or won a number of Italian popular song festivals, including the Canzonissima festival in 1969. In 1962 he was signed by RCA Italiana and achieved national stardom with the song "Fatti mandare dalla mamma", and remained Italy's darling throughout that decade.

In 1970, he represented Italy at the Eurovision Song Contest with "Occhi di ragazza". His career went into a decline in the 1970s but underwent a revival in the 1980s. He won the Festival of Sanremo in 1987 with "Si può dare di più" together with Enrico Ruggeri and Umberto Tozzi, placed second in 1995 and third in 2000 and 2022.

It is estimated that Morandi has sold 50 million recordings.

He has written a number of autobiographical books and appeared in 18 films. In TV he played Claude Jade's husband Davide in the 1984 TV series Voglia di volare. He also played as actor in several TV series, as well as the host in popular Italian television shows.

In 1966 he married actress Laura Efrikian, with whom he played in several Musicarelli films together. The couple divorced in 1979.

Morandi was chosen to be the presenter of Sanremo Music Festival 2011, together with Belén Rodriguez and Elisabetta Canalis. They were joined by comedians Luca Bizzarri and Paolo Kessisoglu from Italia 1's satire show Le Iene. In October 2011, he was confirmed as the presenter of the Sanremo Music Festival 2012.

At the beginning of 2016, Gianni Morandi started a tour called "Capitani Coraggiosi Tour" with Claudio Baglioni. A double album will be published on 5 February. In 2017 he sang with Fabio Rovazzi the song "Volare", a big hit.

In 2019 his 1964 song "In ginocchio da te" gained renewed popularity as it was featured in one of the main scenes of the South Korean movie Parasite, which won four Oscars the following year, including Best Picture.

Morandi participated at the 2022 Sanremo Festival, where his song "Apri Tutte le Porte" finished in 3rd place, in a competition of 25 other singers.

Discography

Studio albums 
Gianni Morandi (1963)
Ritratto di Gianni (1964)
Gianni 3 (1966)
Per amore... Per magia... (1967)
Gianni 4 – Un mondo d'amore (1967)
Gianni 5 (1968)
Gianni 6 (1970)
Gianni 7 (1970)
Un mondo di donne (1971)
Il mondo cambierà (1972)
Jacopone (1973)
Il mondo di frutta candita (1975)
Per poter vivere (1976)
Old Parade Morandi (1978)
Abbraciamoci (1979)
Cantare (1980)
Morandi (1982)
La mia nemica amatissima (1983)
Immagine italiana (1984)
Uno su mille (1985)
Le italiane sono belle (1987)
Dalla/Morandi (1988)
Varietà (1989)
Morandi Morandi (1992)
Morandi (1995)
Celeste azzurro e blu (1997)
Come fa bene l'amore (2000)
L'amore ci cambia la vita (2002)
A chi si ama veramente (2004)
Il tempo migliore (2006)
Canzoni da non perdere (2009)
Bisogna vivere (2013)
D'amore d'autore (2017)

Live albums 
Cantare (1980)
Morandi in teatro (1986)
Live @RTSI Gianni Morandi (1999)
Grazie a tutti, il concerto (2009)
Capitani coraggiosi – Il live (2016)

Filmography

Films

Television

Awards and honors 
 Gianni Morandi has been honorary president of Bologna Football Club 1909 since 2010.
 His songs "In ginocchio da te", "Non son degno di te" and "Scende la pioggia" were certified as having each sold over one million copies, and were awarded gold discs.
 Asteroid 248970 Giannimorandi, discovered by Italian amateur astronomer Vincenzo Casulli in 2007, was named in his honor. The official  was published by the Minor Planet Center on 25 November 2015.

References

External links 

 MorandiMania – Official site
 Archivio di Rai Uno – Biography at raiuno.rai.it
 

1944 births
Living people
People from the Province of Bologna
Italian musicians
Eurovision Song Contest entrants for Italy
Eurovision Song Contest entrants of 1970
Sanremo Music Festival winners
Italian television personalities